The IJmeer is a 'bordering lake' (Randmeer) in the Netherlands. It lies between the De Nes polder (in Waterland), Pampushaven, Hollandse Brug and the mouth of the IJ in IJburg, straddling the provinces of North Holland and Flevoland. It is an important habitat for birds such as the tufted duck and scaup. To the north-east is the Markermeer, south-east is the Gooimeer.

Houses in the IJmeer
Since 1998 islands have been built for the new suburb of IJburg. The first houses were ready in 2003. On 24 November 2004 the Council of State ruled that the construction of further new islands was provisionally banned, because the consequences for the environment were insufficiently researched.

Further plans for the IJmeer
In 2006, the Council for Transport and Public Works and the Environment Board issued a joint opinion stating that Amsterdam and Almere should become conjoined cities with the IJmeer as a 'Central Park'. Partly to this end, Almere has announced plans to build residential areas in the IJmeer, in order for Amsterdam and Almere to grow closer together. There are plans for a connection between Amsterdam and Almere, straight through the IJmeer, through IJburg, and the planned Almere Pampus. Most likely this connection will be a bridge with lanes for public transport (metro and RER-like) and road.

Islands
The IJmeer has a number of islands including: 
De Drost
Hooft (island)
Pampus
Vuurtoreneiland
Warenar

References

Lakes of the Netherlands
Ramsar sites in the Netherlands
Landforms of Flevoland
Landforms of North Holland
Geography of Amsterdam
Geography of Gooise Meren
Almere
Waterland